Pingle is a historic township located in the southern east of Yanling County, Hunan, China.

History
As a historic division of Yanling, Pingle was originally a part of Dingzhi Township (定治乡) in 1949, the 7th county-controlled district in 1950, Pingle Township (平乐乡) in 1956 and Xingfu Commune (幸福公社) in 1958. Derived from a part of Xingfu Commune, Pingle Commune was created in 1961. it was reorganized as a township in 1984. On November 20, 2015, Pingle, Zhongcun and Longzha three townships were merged to create the new Zhongcun Yao Ethnic Township.

Cityscape
The township is divided into 8 villages: Maoping Village, Lefu Village, Mianying Village, Dongping Village, Dongzi Village, Qingshan Village, Jingshan Village, and Xinshan Village.

References

Historic township-level divisions of Yanling County